The Peak Downs Telegram (later the Clermont Telegram) was a newspaper published in Clermont, Queensland, Australia.

History

The Peak Downs Telegram was started by Charles Hardie Buzacott and E. J. Fried on 2 August 1864. Buzacott, however, disposed of his interests in the journal and moved to Gladstone to start the Gladstone Observer in 1869. The last issue of the Peak Downs Telegram appeared on 18 December 1943.

The Clermont Telegram commenced on 10 March 1950 and continued until 6 May 1981. It was purchased in 1980 by the Gibson family who owned the Central Queensland News published in Emerald.

References

Defunct newspapers published in Queensland
Publications established in 1864
1864 establishments in Australia
19th-century publications
1943 disestablishments in Australia
1981 disestablishments in Australia
Clermont, Queensland